OSIRIS-REx (Origins, Spectral Interpretation, Resource Identification, Security, Regolith Explorer) is a NASA asteroid-study and sample-return mission. The mission's primary goal is to obtain a sample of at least  from 101955 Bennu, a carbonaceous near-Earth asteroid, and return the sample to Earth for a detailed analysis. The material returned is expected to enable scientists to learn more about the formation and evolution of the Solar System, its initial stages of planet formation, and the source of organic compounds that led to the formation of life on Earth.

OSIRIS-REx was launched on 8 September 2016, flew past Earth on 22 September 2017, and rendezvoused with Bennu on 3 December 2018. It spent the next several months analyzing the surface to find a suitable site from which to extract a sample. On 20 October 2020, OSIRIS-REx touched down on Bennu and successfully collected a sample. Though some of the sample escaped when the flap that should have closed the sampler head was jammed open by larger rocks, NASA is confident that they were able to retain between 400 g and over 1 kg of sample material, well in excess of the  minimum target mass. OSIRIS-REx is expected to return with its sample to Earth on 24 September 2023 and subsequently start its new mission to study 99942 Apophis as  OSIRIS-APEX ('APophis EXplorer'), arriving at that asteroid in 2029.

Bennu was chosen as the target of study because it is a "time capsule" from the birth of the Solar System. Bennu has a very dark surface and is classified as a B-type asteroid, a sub-type of the carbonaceous C-type asteroids. Such asteroids are considered primitive, having undergone little geological change from their time of formation. In particular, Bennu was selected because of the availability of pristine carbonaceous material, a key element in organic molecules necessary for life as well as representative of matter from before the formation of Earth. Organic molecules, such as amino acids, have previously been found in meteorite and comet samples, indicating that some ingredients necessary for life can be naturally synthesized in outer space.

The cost of the mission is approximately US$800 million, not including the Atlas V launch vehicle, which is about US$183.5 million. It is the third planetary science mission selected in the New Frontiers program, after Juno and New Horizons. The principal investigator is Dante Lauretta from the University of Arizona. If successful, OSIRIS-REx will be the first United States spacecraft to return samples from an asteroid. The Japanese probe Hayabusa returned samples from 25143 Itokawa in 2010, and Hayabusa2 returned from 162173 Ryugu in December 2020. On 10 May 2021, OSIRIS-REx successfully completed its departure from Bennu and began its two-year return to Earth.

Mission 

Overall management, engineering and navigation for the mission is provided by NASA Goddard Space Flight Center, while the University of Arizona Lunar and Planetary Laboratory provides principal science operations and Lockheed Martin Space Systems built the spacecraft and provides mission operations. The science team includes members from the United States, Canada, France, Germany, United Kingdom, and Italy.

Results of that mapping were used by the mission team to select the site from which to take a sample of the asteroid's surface. Then a close approach (without landing) was carried out to allow extension of a robotic arm to gather the sample.

Following a collection of material (60 grams), the sample will be returned to Earth in a  capsule similar to that which returned the samples of a comet 81P/Wild on the Stardust spacecraft. The return trip to Earth will be shorter and the capsule will land with a parachute at the Utah Test and Training Range in September 2023 before being transported to the Johnson Space Center for processing in a dedicated research facility.

Launch 

The launch was on 8 September 2016 at 23:05 UTC on a United Launch Alliance  from Cape Canaveral, Space Launch Complex 41. The 411 rocket configuration consists of a RD-180 powered first stage with a single AJ-60A solid fuel booster, and a Centaur upper stage. OSIRIS-REx separated from the launch vehicle 55 minutes after ignition. The launch was declared "exactly perfect" by the mission's principal investigator, with no anomalies worked before or during launch.

Cruise 
OSIRIS-REx entered the cruise phase shortly after separation from the launch vehicle, following successful solar panel deployment, propulsion system initiation, and establishment of a communication link with Earth. On 28 December 2016, the spacecraft successfully performed its first deep space maneuver to change its velocity by  using  of fuel. An additional, smaller firing of its thrusters on 18 January 2017 further refined its course for an Earth gravity assist on 22 September 2017. The cruise phase lasted until its encounter with Bennu in December 2018, after which it entered its science and sample collection phase.

During its cruise phase, OSIRIS-REx was used to search for a class of near-Earth objects known as Earth-Trojan asteroids as it passed through Sun–Earth  Lagrange point. Between 9–20 February 2017, the OSIRIS-REx team used the spacecraft's MapCam camera to search for the objects, taking about 135 survey images each day for processing by scientists at the University of Arizona. The search was beneficial even though no new trojans were found, as it closely resembled the operation required as the spacecraft approached Bennu, searching for natural satellites and other potential hazards.
On 12 February 2017, while  from Jupiter, the PolyCam instrument aboard OSIRIS-REx successfully imaged the giant planet and three of its moons, Callisto, Io, and Ganymede.

OSIRIS-REx flew by Earth on 22 September 2017.

Arrival and survey 
OSIRIS-REx performed closer passes of the Bennu surface, initially at about  through December to further refine the shape and orbit of Bennu. Preliminary spectroscopic surveys of the asteroid's surface by OSIRIS-REx spacecraft, detected the presence of hydrated minerals in the form of clay. While researchers suspect that Bennu was too small to host water, the hydroxyl groups may have come from water presence in its parent body before Bennu split off.

At this altitude, it takes the spacecraft 62 hours to orbit Bennu.

Sample acquisition

Procedure 
Rehearsals were performed before the sampling event, during which the solar arrays were to be raised into a Y-shaped configuration to minimize the chance of dust accumulation during contact and provide more ground clearance in case the spacecraft tips over (up to 45°) during contact. The descent was very slow to minimize thruster firings prior to contact in order to reduce the likelihood of asteroid surface contamination by unreacted hydrazine propellant. Contact with the surface of Bennu was to be detected using accelerometers, and the impact force was meant to be dissipated by a spring in the TAGSAM arm.

Upon surface contact by the TAGSAM instrument, a burst of nitrogen gas was released, which was meant to blow regolith particles smaller than  into the sampler head at the end of the robotic arm. A five-second timer limited the collection time to mitigate the chance of a collision. After the timer expired, the back-away maneuver executed a safe departure from the asteroid.

The plan was then for OSIRIS-REx to perform a braking maneuver a few days later to halt the drift away from the asteroid in case it was necessary to return for another sampling attempt. It would then take images of the TAGSAM head to verify a sample had been acquired. If a sample was acquired, the spacecraft would rotate about the short axis of the sample arm to determine sample mass by measuring momentum of inertia and determine if it was in excess of the required .

Both the braking and rotation maneuvers were canceled as images of the sample container clearly showed a large excess of material was collected, a portion of which was able to escape through the container's seal due to some material jamming the mechanism open. The collected material was scheduled for immediate storage in the Sample-Return Capsule. On 28 October 2020, the sample collector head was secured in the return capsule. Following the severance of the head from the collector arm, the arm will then be retracted into its launch configuration, and the Sample-Return Capsule lid will be closed and latched preparing to return to Earth.

Operations 

NASA selected the final four candidate sample sites in August 2019, named Nightingale, Kingfisher, Osprey, and Sandpiper. On 12 December 2019, they announced that Nightingale had been selected as the primary sample site and Osprey was selected as the backup site. Both located within craters, Nightingale is near Bennu's north pole while Osprey is near the equator.

NASA's initial plans were to perform the first sampling in late August 2020; NASA's originally planned Touch-and-Go (TAG) sample collection event was scheduled for 25 August 2020, but was rescheduled for 20 October 2020, at 22:13 UTC. On 15 April 2020, the first sample collection rehearsal was successfully performed at the Nightingale sample site. This was the final rehearsal before the sample collection scheduled to take place on 20 October 2020, at 22:13 UTC.

At 22:13 , on 20 October 2020, OSIRIS-REx successfully touched-down on Bennu. NASA confirmed via images taken during sampling that the sampler had made contact. The spacecraft touched down within  of the target location. A sample of the asteroid which was estimated to weigh at least 2 ounces (60 grams) was collected by OSIRIS-REx following the touch down. After imaging the TAGSAM head, NASA concluded that there are rocks wedged in the mylar flap that is meant to keep the sample in, causing the sample to slowly escape into space. In order to prevent further loss of the sample through the flaps, NASA canceled the previously-planned spinning maneuver to determine the mass of the sample as well as a navigational braking maneuver and decided to stow the sample on 27 October 2020 rather than 2 November 2020 as was originally planned, which was completed successfully. It was seen that the collector head hovering over the SRC after the TAGSAM arm moved it into the proper position for capture and later the collector head secured onto the capture ring in the Sample Return Capsule.

When the head was seated into the Sample-Return Capsule's capture ring on 28 October 2020, the spacecraft performed a "backout check", which commanded the TAGSAM arm to back out of the capsule. This maneuver is designed to tug on the collector head and ensure that the latches – which keep the collector head in place – are well secured. Following the test, the mission team received telemetry confirming that the head is properly secured in the Sample-Return Capsule. Thereafter, on 28 October 2020, two mechanical parts on the TAGSAM arm must first be disconnected – these are the tube that carried the nitrogen gas to the TAGSAM head during sample collection and the TAGSAM arm itself. Over the next several hours, the mission team commanded the spacecraft to cut the tube that stirred up the sample through the TAGSAM head during sample collection, and separate the collector head from the TAGSAM arm. Once the team confirmed these activities were done, it commanded the spacecraft on 28 October 2020, to close and seal the Sample-Return Capsule, the final step of the sample stowage process of Bennu's samples. To seal the SRC, the spacecraft closes the lid and then secures two internal latches. The sample of Bennu is safely stored and ready for its journey to Earth. Now that the collector head is secure inside the SRC, pieces of the sample will no longer be lost.

Sample return 
The OSIRIS-REx team is now preparing the spacecraft for the next phase of the mission, the return cruise to Earth. On 7 April 2021, OSIRIS-REx completed its final flyover of Bennu and began slowly drifting away from the asteroid. On 10 May 2021, OSIRIS-REx officially left the Bennu asteroid and began its two year journey to Earth with the asteroid sample.

On 24 September 2023, the OSIRIS-REx return capsule is scheduled to re-enter Earth's atmosphere and land under a parachute at the Air Force's Utah Test and Training Range. The sample would be curated at NASA's Astromaterials Research and Exploration Science Directorate (ARES) and at Japan's Extraterrestrial Sample Curation Center. The sample material from the asteroid would be distributed to requesting organisations worldwide by ARES.

Extended mission
On 25 April 2022, NASA confirmed that the mission would be extended. After dropping off its sample to Earth in 2023, the mission will become OSIRIS-APEX ('APophis EXplorer'). As its new name suggests, its next target will be the near-Earth asteroid (and potentially hazardous object) 99942 Apophis. Apophis will make an extremely close pass to the Earth on 13 April 2029. Observations of Apophis will commence on 8 April 2029, and a few days later, on 21 April, OSIRIS-APEX is planned to rendezvous with the asteroid. OSIRIS-APEX will orbit Apophis for around 18 months in a regime similar to that at Bennu. The spacecraft will perform a maneuver, similar to sample collection at Bennu, by using its thrusters to disturb Apophis's surface, in order to expose and spectrally study the subsurface and the material beneath it.

Name 
OSIRIS-REx and OSIRIS-APEX are acronyms, and each letter or combination of letters relates to part of the respective projects:
 O – originsO – origins
 SI – spectral interpretationSI – spectral interpretation
 RI – resource identificationRI – resource identification
 S – securityS – security
 REx – regolith explorerAPEX – Apophis Explorer

Each of these words was chosen to represent an aspect of this mission. For example, the S, for security means the security of Earth from hazardous NEO. Specifically it refers to better understanding the Yarkovsky effect, that changes the trajectory of the asteroid. Regolith Explorer means that the mission will study the texture, morphology, geochemistry, and spectral properties of the regolith of asteroid Bennu while Apophis Explorer corresponds to the study of Apophis asteroid.

When its heritage concept was proposed in the Discovery Program in 2004, it was called only OSIRIS, with REx for "Regolith Explorer" used descriptively rather than as part of the name. This mission is also sometimes called New Frontiers 3, for it being the third of the New Frontiers program missions.

The acronym OSIRIS was chosen in reference to the ancient mythological Egyptian god Osiris, the underworld lord of the dead. Dante Lauretta, deputy PI of the mission, was called "a mythology buff" by the mission PI Michael Drake: "he was doodling on a pad and trying to capture the principal themes of what we are trying to do with this mission study life origins, identify resources, planetary security in the form of asteroid deflection and he realized he got the name of Osiris out of that, an ancient god of Egypt who may have been one of the first pharaohs."

Science objectives 

The science objectives of the mission are:
 Return and analyze a sample of pristine carbonaceous asteroid regolith in an amount sufficient to study the nature, history, and distribution of its constituent minerals and organic compounds
 Map the global properties, chemistry, and mineralogy of a primitive carbonaceous asteroid to characterize its geologic and dynamic history and provide context for the returned samples
 Document the texture, morphology, geochemistry, and spectral properties of the regolith at the sampling site in situ at scales down to millimeters
 Measure the Yarkovsky effect (a thermal force on the object) on a potentially hazardous asteroid and constrain the asteroid properties that contribute to this effect
 Characterize the integrated global properties of a primitive carbonaceous asteroid to allow for direct comparison with ground-based telescopic data of the entire asteroid population

It completes an orbit of the Sun every 436.604 days (1.2 years). This orbit takes it close to the Earth every six years. Although the orbit is reasonably well known, scientists continue to refine it. It is critical to know the orbit of Bennu because recent calculations produced a cumulative probability of 1 in 1410 (or 0.071%) of impact with Earth in the period 2169 to 2199. One of the mission objectives is to refine understanding of non-gravitational effects (such as the Yarkovsky effect) on this orbit, and the implications of those effects for Bennu's collision probability. Knowing Bennu's physical properties will be critical for future scientists to understand when developing an asteroid impact avoidance mission.

Specifications 

 Dimensions: Length , width , height 
 Width with solar arrays deployed: 
 Power: Two solar arrays generate 1226 to 3000 Watts, depending on the spacecraft's distance from the Sun. Energy is stored in Li-ion batteries.
 Propulsion system: Based on a hydrazine monopropellant system developed for the Mars Reconnaissance Orbiter, carrying  of propellant and helium.
 The sample-return capsule will reenter the Earth's atmosphere for a parachute assisted landing. The capsule with encased samples will be retrieved from Earth's surface and studied, as was done with the Stardust mission.

Instruments 
In addition to its telecommunication equipment, the spacecraft carries a suite of instruments to image and analyze the asteroid on many wavelengths, and retrieve a physical sample to return to Earth. The Planetary Society coordinated a campaign to invite interested persons to have their names or artwork on the mission's spirit of exploration saved on a microchip now carried in the spacecraft.

OCAMS 

The OSIRIS-REx Camera Suite (OCAMS) consists of the PolyCam, the MapCam, and the SamCam. Together, they acquire information on asteroid Bennu by providing global mapping, sample site reconnaissance and characterization, high-resolution imaging, and records of the sample acquisition.
 PolyCam, an  telescope, acquired visible-light images with increasingly higher resolution on approach the asteroid and high-resolution surface images from orbit
 MapCam searches for satellites and outgassing plumes. It maps the asteroid in four blue, green, red and near infrared channels, and informs the model of Bennu's shape and provides high resolution imaging of the potential sample sites
 SamCam continuously documents the sample acquisitions

OVIRS 

The OSIRIS-REx Visible and IR Spectrometer (OVIRS) is a spectrometer which maps minerals and organic substances on the asteroid's surface. It provides full-disc asteroid spectral data at 20 m resolution. This data will be used in concert with OTES spectra to guide sample-site selection. The spectral ranges and resolving powers are sufficient to provide surface maps of carbonates, silicates, sulfates, oxides, adsorbed water and a wide range of organic compounds.

OTES 

The OSIRIS-REx Thermal Emission Spectrometer (OTES) provides thermal emission spectral maps and local spectral information of candidate sample sites in the thermal infrared channel covering 4–50 µm, again to map mineral and organic substances. The wavelength range, spectral resolution, and radiometric performance are sufficient to resolve and identify silicates, carbonates, sulfates, phosphates, oxides, and hydroxide minerals. OTES is also used to measure the total thermal emission from Bennu in support of the requirement to measure emitted radiation globally.

Based on the performance of Mini-TES in the dusty surface environment of Mars, OTES was designed to be resilient to extreme dust contamination on the optical elements.

REXIS 
The Regolith X-ray Imaging Spectrometer (REXIS) will provide an X-ray spectroscopy map of Bennu to map element abundances. REXIS is a collaborative development by four groups within Massachusetts Institute of Technology (MIT) and Harvard University, with the potential to involve more than 100 students throughout the process. REXIS is based on flight heritage hardware, thereby minimizing elements of technical risk, schedule risk, and cost risk.

REXIS is a coded aperture soft X-ray (0.3–7.5 keV) telescope that images X-ray fluorescence line emission produced by the absorption of solar X-rays and the solar wind with elements in the regolith of Bennu leading to local X-ray emissions. Images are formed with 21 arcminute resolution (4.3 m spatial resolution at a distance of 700 m). Imaging is achieved by correlating the detected X-ray image with a 64×64 element random mask (1.536 mm pixels). REXIS will store each X-ray event data in order to maximize the data storage usage and to minimize the risk. The pixels will be addressed in 64×64 bins and the 0.3–7.5 keV range will be covered by five broad bands and 11 narrow line bands. A 24 second resolution time tag will be interleaved with the event data to account for Bennu rotation. Images will be reconstructed on the ground after downlink of the event list. Images are formed simultaneously in 16 energy bands centered on the dominant lines of abundant surface elements from O-K (0.5 keV) to Fe-Kß (7 keV) as well the representative continuum. During orbital phase 5B, a 21 day orbit 700 m from the surface of Bennu, a total of at least 133 events/asteroid pixel/energy band are expected under 2 keV; enough to obtain significant constraints on element abundances at scales larger than 10 m.

On 11 November 2019, university students and researchers involved in the mission accidentally discovered X-ray burst from a black hole name MAXI J0637-430 locate 30,000 light-years away, during observing the asteroid with REXIS.

OLA 
The OSIRIS-REx Laser Altimeter (OLA) is a scanning and lidar instrument that will provide high resolution topographical information throughout the mission. The information received by OLA creates global topographic maps of Bennu, local maps of candidate sample sites, ranging in support of other instruments, and support navigation and gravity analyses.

OLA scans the surface of Bennu at specific intervals to rapidly map the entire surface of the asteroid to achieve its primary objective of producing local and global topographic maps. The data collected by OLA will also be used to develop a control network relative to the center of mass of the asteroid and to enhance and refine gravitational studies of Bennu.

OLA has a single common receiver and two complementary transmitter assemblies that enhance the resolution of the information brought back. The repetition rate of these transmitters sets the data acquisition rate of OLA. Laser pulses from both the low and high energy transmitters are directed onto a movable scanning mirror, which is co-aligned with the field of view of the receiver telescope limiting the effects of background solar radiation. Each pulse provides target range, azimuth, elevation, received intensity and a time-tag.

OLA was funded by the Canadian Space Agency (CSA) and was built by MDA at Brampton, Ontario, Canada. OLA was delivered for integration with the spacecraft on 17 November 2015. The lead instrument scientist of OLA is Michael Daly from York University.

TAGSAM 

The sample-return system, called Touch-And-Go Sample Acquisition Mechanism (TAGSAM), consists of a sampler head with an articulated  arm. The surface contact pads will also collect fine-grained material.

Highlights of the TAGSAM instrument and technique include:
 Relative approach velocity of 
 Contact within  of selected location
 OCAMS documents sampling at 1 Hz
 Collect samples in less than five seconds, direct nitrogen (N2) annular jet fluidizes regolith, surface-contact pad captures surface sample
 Verify bulk sample collection via spacecraft inertia change; surface sample by imaging sampler head
 Sampler head stored in sample-return capsule and returned to Earth

Cooperation with JAXA 
Hayabusa2 is a similar mission from JAXA to collect samples from near-Earth asteroid 162173 Ryugu. It arrived at the asteroid in June 2018, left in November 2019 after two successful sample collections, and returned to Earth in December 2020. The recovery capsule of Hayabusa2 re-entered Earth atmosphere and landed in Australia, as planned, on 5 December 2020. The sample contents will be extensively analyzed, including water content which will provide clues on the initial formation of the asteroid. The main module of Hayabusa2 is performing a swing-by procedure to "push" it onward to its next destination, asteroid 1998KY26. Due to the similarity and overlapping timelines of the two missions (OSIRIS-REx is still in the return phase), NASA and JAXA signed an agreement to collaborate on sample exchange and research. The two teams visited each other, with representatives from JAXA visiting the OSIRIS-REx Science Operations Center at the University of Arizona, and members of the OSIRIS-REx team traveling to Japan to meet with the Hayabusa2 team. The teams are sharing software, data, and techniques for analysis, and will eventually exchange portions of the samples that are returned to Earth.

OSIRIS-REx II 
OSIRIS-REx II was a 2012 mission concept to replicate the original spacecraft for a double mission, with the second vehicle collecting samples from the two moons of Mars, Phobos and Deimos. It was stated that this mission would be both the quickest and least expensive way to get samples from the moons.

Gallery

See also

References

External links 

  mission website at NASA
  mission website at the University of Arizona
 
 Video (2:53) – Asteroid Bennu Mission Overview (NASA; 11 May 2021).

Astrobiology space missions
Missions to near-Earth asteroids
NASA space probes
New Frontiers program
Orbiters (space probe)
 
Planetary defense
Sample return missions
Spacecraft launched by Atlas rockets
Space probes launched in 2016
Articles containing video clips